James Francis Maxwell was a politician in Queensland, Australia. He was the mayor of the City of Brisbane and a member of the Queensland Legislative Assembly for Toowong.

Early life 

James Francis Maxwell was born in 1862 in County Armagh, Ireland, the son of Samuel Maxwell and his wife Matilda (née Stoops). On  23 July 1890 he married Alice Annie Letitia Davies at St Peter's Church at West End, Brisbane, the daughter of John Davies, the engineer and manager at the South Brisbane Gas Company who designed the (now heritage-listed) West End Gasworks.

Politics 
Maxwell was a member of the Toombul Shire Council and its chairman in 1904 and 1905.

Maxwell was the mayor of the City of Brisbane from 1920 to 1921.

Maxwell was elected to Queensland Legislative Assembly on the 9 October 1920, for Toowong as a member of the National Party. He was re-elected on 15 May 1923 as a member for the Queensland United Party and then re-elected on 8 May 1926 as a member of Country and Progressive National Party. He did not contest the election of 2 April 1938.

References

Members of the Queensland Legislative Assembly
1862 births
1941 deaths
National Party (Queensland, 1917) members of the Parliament of Queensland